Burak Yacan Yüksel (born 9 March 1992, Turkey) is a Turkish basketball player. He currently plays in the power forward and small forward positions for Aliağa Petkim and he grew up from Anadolu Efes S.K.'s youth academy named "First Step With Efes". He is a future-talented basketball player.

References
TBLStat.net Profile
Team Website Profile
Interview
Burak Yacan Yüksel ile 3 Dakika

External links
TBLStat.net Profile
Team Website Profile

1992 births
Living people
Aliağa Petkim basketball players
Anadolu Efes S.K. players
Power forwards (basketball)
Small forwards
Turkish men's basketball players